Jobat Assembly constituency is one of the 230 Vidhan Sabha (Legislative Assembly) constituencies of Madhya Pradesh state in central India. This constituency came into existence in 1951, as one of the 79 Vidhan Sabha constituencies of the erstwhile Madhya Bharat state. This constituency is reserved for the candidates belonging to the Scheduled tribes since its inception.

Overview
Jobat (constituency number 192) is one of the two Vidhan Sabha constituencies located in Alirajpur district. This constituency covers the entire Bhavra tehsil, Jobat nagar panchayat and parts of Jobat and Alirajpur tehsils of this district.

Jobat is part of Ratlam Lok Sabha constituency along with seven other Vidhan Sabha segments, namely, Alirajpur in this district, Jhabua, Thandla and Petlawad in Jhabua district and Ratlam Rural, Ratlam City and Sailana in Ratlam district.

Members of Legislative Assembly
As a constituency of Madhya Bharat:
 1951: Premsingh, Socialist Party

As a constituency of Madhya Pradesh:
 1957: Ganga, Indian National Congress
 1962: Raysinha, Socialist Party
 1967: Ajmer Singh, Indian National Congress
 1972: Ajmer Singh, Indian National Congress
 1977: Ajmer Singh, Indian National Congress
 1980: Amar Singh, Indian National Congress (I)
 1985: Ajmer Singh, Indian National Congress
 1990: Ajmer Singh, Indian National Congress
 1993: Ajmer Singh, Indian National Congress
 1998: Sulochana Rawat, Indian National Congress
 2003: Madho Singh, Bharatiya Janata Party
 2008: Sulochana Rawat, Indian National Congress
 2013: Madhosingh Dawar, Bharatiya Janata Party
 2018: Kalawati Bhuria, Indian National Congress

Election results

2021 Bypoll

See also
 Jobat

References

Alirajpur district
Assembly constituencies of Madhya Pradesh